UNPA may refer to:

 United National Progressive Alliance, a political grouping in India
United Nations Parliamentary Assembly, a proposed elected parliament for the UN
United Nations Postal Administration, the postal system of the UN
United Nations Protected Area (UNFICYP), Cyprus; see UNFICYP
United Nations Protected Area (UNPROFOR), in the former Yugoslav Republic of Croatia
Unione Nazionale Protezione Antiaerea, a civil defense organisation of Fascist Italy
, Tuxtepec, Oaxaca state, Mexico
National University of Austral Patagonia (Universidad Nacional de la Patagonia Austral), Santa Cruz Province, Argentina
Unpa County, North Korea